Fathabad (also Romanized as Fatḩābād) is a village in Qaleh-ye Mozaffari Rural District, in the Central District of Selseleh County, Lorestan Province, Iran. At the 2006 census, its population was 69, in 15 families.

References 

Towns and villages in Selseleh County